Gundabathula Venkateswara Rao (born 1944) is an Indian materials engineer, known for his studies in the field of Structural mechanics. Focusing his researches on Finite element method, Structural analysis and Smart materials, he and his colleagues developed FEAST, a medium-sized program for laboratory research and industrial applications including design and analysis of rocket systems. An alumnus of the Indian Institute of Science from where he secured a PhD, his researches have been documented in several peer-reviewed articles and his work has been cited by several scientists. Google Scholar, an online article repository of scientific articles, has listed a number of his articles. The Indian Academy of Sciences elected him as a fellow in 2003. The Council of Scientific and Industrial Research, the apex agency of the Government of India for scientific research, awarded him the Shanti Swarup Bhatnagar Prize for Science and Technology, one of the highest Indian science awards for his contributions to Engineering Sciences in 1989.

Notes

References 
 
 
 

Recipients of the Shanti Swarup Bhatnagar Award in Engineering Science
1944 births
Indian scientific authors
Indian materials scientists
20th-century Indian engineers
Indian Institute of Science alumni
Living people
Telugu people
People from Andhra Pradesh